List of people from Serbia is a list of notable people from Serbia. The list contains names of people who are associated with Serbia and its territory by their place of birth, and also by naturalization, domicile, citizenship or some other similar connection, modern or historical. List is territorially defined, and includes all people from Serbia, regardless of their ethnic, linguistic, religious or some other personal distinctions.

Royalty and nobility

Serbian monarchs

Unknown Archon
Višeslav
Radoslav
Prosigoj
Vlastimir
Mutimir
Pribislav
Petar
Pavle
Zaharija
Časlav
Beloje
Krajina Belojević
Hvalimir Belojević
Čučimir Belojević
Petar of Duklja
Jovan Vladimir
Stefan Vojislav
Mihailo Vojislavljević
Constantine Bodin
Vukan
Uroš I
Uroš II
Beloš
Desa
Tihomir
Stefan Nemanja
Vukan Nemanjić
Stefan the First-Crowned
Stefan Radoslav
Stefan Vladislav
Stefan Uroš I
Stefan Dragutin
Stefan Milutin
Vladislav, King of Syrmia
Stefan Dečanski
Stefan Dušan
Stefan Uroš V
Simeon Uroš
Jovan Uroš

Vukašin of Serbia
Prince Marko
Lazar of Serbia
Đurađ I Balšić
Balša II
Vuk Branković
Đurađ II Balšić
Nikola Altomanović
Jovan Dragaš
Konstantin Dejanović
Stefan Lazarević
Balša III
Đurađ Branković
Stefan Crnojević
Lazar Branković
Stefan Branković
Ivan Crnojević
Vuk Grgurević
Đorđe Branković
Đurađ Crnojević
Jovan Branković
Stefan II Crnojević
Radič Božić
Pavle Bakić
Stefan Štiljanović
Jovan Nenad
Radoslav Čelnik
Karađorđe
Miloš Obrenović
Milan Obrenović II
Mihailo Obrenović
Alexander Karađorđević
Danilo I, Prince of Montenegro
Nikola I Petrović-Njegoš
Milan I of Serbia
Alexander I of Serbia
Peter I of Serbia
Alexander I of Yugoslavia
Prince Paul of Yugoslavia
Peter II of Yugoslavia

Serbian princesses

Jelena Vukanović, (b. after 1109 – after 1146), Queen of Hungary
Jelisaveta Nemanjić, (fl. 1270 – died 1331), Baness of Bosnia
Princess Milica of Serbia, (ca. 1335–1405)
Jelena Balšić (1365/1366–1443), Lady of Zeta; Grand Duchess of Hum
Ana-Neda, Empress of Bulgaria
Dragana of Serbia, Empress of Bulgaria
Helena Dragaš, (c. 1372 – 23 March 1450), Byzantine empress, mother of emperors John VIII Palaiologos and Constantine XI Palaiologos
Olivera Lazarević, Ottoman consort
Mara Branković, Ottoman consort
Kantakuzina Katarina Branković (1418/19 – 1492), countess of County of Celje
Mara Branković, last Queen of Bosnia and Despoina of Serbia
Jelena Rareš, princess of Moldavia, regent in 1551–1553
Milica Despina of Wallachia, (c. 1485–1554), Princess of Wallachia, regent in Wallachia in 1521–1522
Ana Jakšić Glinska, mother of Elena Glinskaya and grandmother of Tsar Ivan the Terrible
Jelena Jakšić, titular Despotissa of Serbia, wife of Despot Jovan Branković
Şehsuvar Sultan, Ottoman consort
Ljubica Vukomanović, (September 1788 – 26 May 1843), Princess of Serbia
Persida Nenadović, (15 February 1813 – 29 March 1873), Princess of Serbia
Draga Mašin, (11 September 1864 – 11 June 1903), Queen of Serbia

Serbian nobility

Politicians and diplomats

19th and the 20th century

Petar Ičko (1775–1808), Karageorge's political envoy to Constantinople.
Petar Nikolajević Moler
 Toma Vučić-Perišić
Avram Petronijević
Aleksa Simić
Ljubomir Kaljević
Milan Piroćanac
Sava Grujić
Jovan Avakumović
Petar Velimirović
Đorđe Simić
Milutin Garašanin
Stojan Novaković
Jovan Ristić 
Svetozar Miletić
Ilija Garašanin
Milutin Garašanin
Nikola Hristić
Jovan Marinović
Pavle Beljanski, diplomat and art connoisseur
Milivoje Petrović Blaznavac
Nikola Pašić (Radical/Prime Minister)
Svetomir Nikolajević
Jaša Prodanović
Lazar Arsenijević Batalaka
Nikola Uzunović
Bogoljub Jevtić
Puniša Račić
Dr. Stevan Moljević
Dr. Živko Topalović
Dimitrije Ljotić (Nationalist/Collaborationist during World War II)
Ljubomir Davidović (Democrat)
Milan Grol
Dušan Simović
Slobodan Jovanović
Milovan Milovanović, Serbian politician, diplomat and constitutional lawyer
Momčilo Ninčić
Dragoljub Mićunović
Svetozar Pribićević (Democrat)
Velimir Vukićević (Radical/Prime Minister)
Milan Stojadinović (Radical/Prime Minister)
Dragiša Cvetković (Radical)
Dobrica Matković (Radical)
Vladimir Dedijer (Communist)
Svetozar Marković (Socialist)
Svetozar Delić (Among the first Communists who became Mayor of Zagreb)
Veljko Milatović (Communist; and alleged killer of Krsto Zrnov Popović)
Miloš Minić (Communist)
Latinka Perović (Communist)
Milentije Popović (Communist)
Aleksandar Ranković(Communist)
Ivan Stambolić (Communist)
Đorđe Vojnović
Kosta Taušanović
Dragiša Cvetković (pre-World War II prime minister)

Modern times

Siniša Mali
Tomislav Nikolić, former President of Serbia
Boris Tadić, former President of Serbia
Mirko Cvetković, former Prime Minister of Serbia
Nenad Bogdanović
Predrag Bubalo
Dragan Čavić
Nebojša Čović
Ivica Dačić, minister of foreign affairs and former Prime Minister of Serbia
Vojislav Koštunica, former Prime Minister of Serbia and former President of Yugoslavia
Miroljub Labus
Slobodan Lalović
Zoran Lončar
Predrag Marković
Dejan Mihajlov
Tomica Milosavljević
Radomir Naumov
Đurđe Ninković
Milan Panić, former Prime Minister of Yugoslavia
Borislav Paravac
Milan Parivodić
Mirko Šarović
Goran Svilanović
Veroljub Stevanović
Vojislav Šešelj
Slobodan Vuksanović
Velimir Ilić
Andrija Mandić, leader of Serbs in Montenegro
Vuk Drašković
Radoman Bozovic
Borisav Jović, former president of Yugoslavia)
Slobodan Milošević
Peter, Hereditary Prince of Yugoslavia

Military

Medieval and Early modern period
Novak Grebostrek
Miloš Obilić, knight and hero
Ivan Kosančić, knight
Milan Toplica, knight
Stanislav Sočivica (1715–1777), Serbian rebel leader, active in Bosnia and Herzegovina and Montenegro.
Koča Andjelković (1755–1788), Austrian volunteer and Serbian rebel leader.

Modern
19th-century revolutionaries

See: List of Serbian Revolutionaries
Karađorđe (1762–1817), leader of the First Serbian Uprising (1804–13)
Kara-Marko Vasić, Serbian revolutionary who participated in the First Serbian Uprising
Hadži-Prodan Gligorijević (1760–1825), commander in the First Serbian Uprising and volunteer in the Greek War of Independence
Mladen Milovanović, commander in the First Serbian Uprising
Hajduk Veljko Petrović, commander in the First Serbian Uprising
Čolak-Anta Simeonović, commander in the First Serbian Uprising
Stanoje Stamatović Glavaš, commander in the First Serbian Uprising
Stevan Sinđelić, commander in the First Serbian Uprising
Petar Dobrnjac, commander in the First Serbian Uprising
Sima Nenadović, commander in the First Serbian Uprising
Matija Nenadović, commander in the First Serbian Uprising
Jakov Nenadović, commander in the First Serbian Uprising

Novica Cerović (1805–1895), noted for his successful assault against a local Muslim tyrant precipitating The Death of Smail-aga Čengić under the auspices of Petar II Petrović-Njegoš thereby freeing parts of Herzegovina from the Ottoman Empire and joining them to the Principality of Montenegro. His heroism and the death of Smail-aga Čengić was the theme of Ivan Mažuranić's epic poem celebrating the struggle for freedom.
Marko Miljanov, Montenegrin commander
Vasos Mavrovouniotis, volunteer in the Greek War of Independence
Jovan Mišković,  commander in the Serbian-Turkish Wars (1876–1878)
Rista Cvetković-Božinče
 Aksentije Bacetić

Balkan Wars and World War I

Ljubomir Kovačević
Gavro Vuković
General Petar Bojović
General Božidar Janković
General Živojin Mišić
General Radomir Putnik
General Stepa Stepanović
General Jovan Atanacković
General Vojin Popović, also known as Vojvoda Vuk.
Major Dragutin Gavrilović
Milunka Savić, war heroine of the 1913 Balkan War and World War I, wounded nine times.
Sofija Jovanović, war heroine of the 1913 Balkan War and World War I
Stanislav Sondermayer, Serbian World War I soldier, the youngest to be killed in action
Tadija Sondermajer, Serbian aviator, aeronautical engineer, founder and director of Aeroput, Yugoslavia's first airline

World War II

 General Milan Nedić
Dimitrije Ljotić
Kosta Mušicki
Milan Spasić, naval hero of World War II
Nikola Kavaja
General Draža Mihailović
General Nikola Ljubičić
General Kosta Nađ
General Dušan Simović
Jezdimir Dangić

Yugoslav wars

General Blagoje Adžić
General Dragoljub Ojdanić
General Ljubiša Jokić
General Vladimir Lazarević
General Nebojša Pavković
General Života Panić
General Dragan Paskaš
General Aleksandar Vasiljević
Jovica Stanišić, intelligence officer and head of the State Security Service (SDB) (1992–1998)

Foreign service

Various states
Evgenije Popović fought in a detachment commanded by Giuseppe Garibaldi, Italy.
Mićo Ljubibratić also fought with Giuseppe Garibaldi.
Ilija Monte Radlovic served in the British Army during World War II.
Vito Marija Bettera-Vodopić (1771–1841) in the service of Imperial Russia, died as an Austrian prisoner in occupied-Ukraine.
Janos Damjanich (1804–1849), Hungarian General
Jakov Ignjatović, Hungary
Sebo Vukovics, Hungary
Dome Sztojay, Hungary
Paul Davidovich, Austria-Hungary
Adam Bajalics von Bajahaza, Austria-Hungary
Petar Preradović, Austrian general
Emil Vojnović, Austrian general and military historian
Arsenije Sečujac, Austrian general
Jeronim Ljubibratić, Austrian Field marshal
Paul von Radivojevich, Austrian general
Svetozar Boroević, Baron von Bojna, Austro-Hungarian and Croatian field marshal of Serbian origin
Stevan Šupljikac Voivod (Duke) of Serbian Vojvodina (1848), Austria-Hungary
Karl Paul von Quosdanovich, Austrian general
Peter Vitus von Quosdanovich, Austrian Field marshal
Emil Uzelac first joined the Austrian Air Force of Austro-Hungarian Empire.
King Peter I of Serbia led his government, army, and civilian refugees through the Montenegrin and Albanian mountains to the Adriatic seacoast where they were eventually transported by Allied ships to Corfu, Vido and Thessaloniki in World War I Greece (Government-in-Exile).
Stojan Janković led Serbs from Dalmatia and Montenegro in the Cretan War of 1645–1669 on the side of the Republic of Venice.
Starina Novak, Hajduk and Moldavian ally
Constantin Brancoveanu, Wallachia
At the end of the 15th century, Raci warriors came to the Polish Kingdom and played an important role in forming the Polish hussars.
Constantine Tikh of Bulgaria
Jovan Monasterlija led Serbian Militia in the name of Leopold I, Holy Roman Emperor against the Turks.
Ilija Perajica was a 17th-century freedom-fighter
Vuk Isakovič (1696–1759) was Serb military commander in the Austrian-Ottoman Wars.
Petar Marinovich, France

Russian Empire

Petar Tekelija, General-in-Chief, achieved the highest rank among the Serbs who served in the Imperial Russian Army, In the service of Peter the Great and his daughter Elizabeth of Russia
Semyon Zorich (1743–1799) distinguished himself in the Seven Years' War and the first Russo-Turkish War. He was the recipient of the Order of St. George on Pyotr Rumyantsev's recommendation. He was promoted to Lieutenant-General (1797). In the service of Catherine the Great
Mikhail Andreyevich Miloradovich (1771–1825) In the service of Tsar Alexander I during the French invasion of Russia
Georgi Emmanuel
Nikolay Depreradovich
Rajko Depreradović
Andrei Miloradovich
Ivan Adamovich
Jovan Horvat
Simeon Piščević
Jovan Albanez
Simeon Končarević
Jovan Šević
Ilya Duka
Dmitry Horvat
Dejan Subotić
Ivan Lukačević
Radola Gajda, in the service of Czar Nicholas II of Russia during the Great War and after
John of Shanghai and San Francisco, In the service of Czar Nicholas II of Russia during the Great War and after
John of Tobolsk, in the service of Czar Nicholas II of Russia during the Great War and after
Nikolay Gerasimovich Kuznetsov, served during the Great Patriotic War
Aleksej Jelačić, served during the Great Patriotic War
Aleksa Dundić
Nikolai Dimitrievich Dabić

Ottoman Empire

Veli Mahmud Pasha, Ottoman Grand Vizier 1456–68 and 1472–74, Serbian-Byzantine from Novo Brdo.
Zagan Pasha, Ottoman Grand Vizier from 1453 to 1456
Deli Husrev Pasha, Ottoman statesman and second vizier
Hadım Ali Pasha, Ottoman Grand Vizier from 1501 to 1503 and 1506 to 1511
Lala Mustafa Pasha,  Ottoman Grand Vizier in 1580
Semiz Ali Pasha, Ottoman Grand Vizier from 1561 to 1565
Sokolluzade Lala Mehmed Pasha, Ottoman Grand Vizier from 1604 to 1606
Boşnak Derviş Mehmed Pasha, Ottoman Grand Vizier during 1606
Nevesinli Salih Pasha, Ottoman Grand Vizier from 1645 to 1647
Kara Musa Pasha, Ottoman Grand Vizier during 1647
Sarı Süleyman Pasha, Ottoman Grand Vizier from 1685 to 1687
Daltaban Mustafa Pasha, Ottoman Grand Vizier from 1702 to 1703
 Damat Melek Mehmed Pasha, Ottoman Grand Vizier from 1792 to 1794
Ivaz Mehmed Pasha, Ottoman Grand Vizier from 1739 to 1740
Yavuz Ali Pasha, Ottoman Governor of Egypt from 1601 to 1603
George Berovich, Governor-General of Crete and Prince of Samos.
Gedik Ahmed Pasha, Grand Vizier 1474–77. Serbian from Vranje.
Omar Pasha (1806–1871), general, convert
Mara Branković, wife of Murad II, very influential in imperial affairs, ambassador to Venice
Aşub Sultan, originally Katarina, consort of Sultan Ibrahim I and mother of Sultan Suleiman II.
Şehsuvar Sultan, originally Maria, consort of Sultan Mustafa II (r. 1695–1703) and mother of Sultan Osman III (r. 1754–1757).
Olivera Despina, daughter of Prince Lazar, consort of Sultan Bayezid I.
Osman Aga of Temesvar (1670–1725), Ottoman commander
Meylişah Hatun, Consort to Sultan Osman II
Skenderbeg Crnojević
George Berovich
Aganlija
Kučuk-Alija
Sali Aga

USA
For Serbian American military personnel, see this list

Religion

Heads of the Serbian Orthodox Church

Saint Sava
Saint Arsenije I Sremac (1233–1263)
Saint Sava II (1263–1271)
Archbishop Danilo I (1271–1272)
Joanikije I (1272–1276)
Saint Jevstatije I (1279–1286)
Saint Jakov (1286–1292)
Saint Jevstatije II (1292–1309)
Saint Sava III (1309–1316)
Saint Nikodim I (1316–1324)
Saint Danilo II (1324–1337)
Saint Joanikije II (1338–1345) and as first Serbian patriarch (1346–1354)
Patriarch Sava IV (1354–1375)
Jefrem (1375–1380) and (1389–1390)
Spiridon (1380–11 August 1389)
Danilo III (1390–1396)
Patriarch Arsenije III Crnojević (1672–1690)
Patriarch Kalinik I (1691–1710)
Patriarch Arsenije IV Jovanović Šakabenta (1726–1737)
Serbian Patriarch Joanikije III (1739–1746)
Patriarch Kalinik II (1765–1766)
Serbian Patriarch Dimitrije (1920–1930)
Serbian Patriarch Varnava (1930–1937)
Serbian Patriarch Gavrilo V (1838–1950)
Serbian Patriarch Vikentije II (1950–1958)
Serbian Patriarch German (1958–1990)
Serbian Patriarch Pavle (1990–2009)
Serbian Patriarch Irinej (2010–20??)
Saint Angelina (died 1520), despotess consort of Stephen Branković, wrote a hagiography
Stefan Brankovic
Lazar Brankovic
Jovan Vladimir
Lazar of Serbia
Nikolaj Velimirović
Slobodan Šiljak
Stefan Stiljanovic
Theodor Komogovinski
Đorđe Bogić (1911–1941), parish priest of Našice, was tortured and slain by the Ustasha on the order of a Roman Catholic priest of the same village
Mitrofan Ban, Exarch, receiver of the Obilić medal in the Montenegrin-Ottoman War 1876–1878
Saint Platon of Banja Luka
Dositej Vasić

Theologians
Justin Popović
Josif Rajačić
Nikolaj Velimirović
Nikodim Milaš
Amfilohije Radović

Artists

Visual artists

Architects

Aleksandar Deroko, architect, artist, professor and author
Aleksandar Đokić, architect known for Brutalist and postmodernist styles
Bogdan Bogdanović, architect, urbanist and essayist, designed monumental concrete sculpture in Jasenovac
Dragiša Brašovan, modernist architect, leading architect of the early 20th century in Yugoslavia
Ivan Antić, architect and academic, considered one of the former Yugoslavia's best post-World War 2 architects
Konstantin Jovanović, architect who designed National assemblies of Serbia and Bulgaria and National Bank of Serbia
Jelisaveta Načić, pioneer in women's architecture in Serbia
Mihailo Janković, architect who designed several important structures in Serbia
Milan Zloković, architect, founder of the Group of Architects of Modern Expressions.
Momčilo Tapavica, designer of Novi Sad's Matica Srpska building; also 1st Serb to win an Olympic medal at 1st modern Olympic Games (Athens, Greece, 1896)
Svetozar Ivačković, post-Romantic architect
Zoran Manević, prominent Serbian architecture historian
Ilija Arnautović, Slovene architect (of Serb origin), known for his projects during the period of Slovenian socialism (1960–1980)
Dimitrije T. Leko, Serbian architect and urbanist
Dubravka Sekulić, architect and academic
Zoran Bojović (architect) (born 1936), architect for Energoprojekt, worked in Africa
Milica Šterić (born 1914), architect for Energoprojekt, built post-World War II power plants
Ljiljana Bakić (born 1939), Serbian architect
Ivanka Raspopović (born 1930), Serbian architect
Maja Vidaković Lalić, architect
Jovanka Bončić-Katerinić (born 1887), architect, 1st woman engineer in Germany
Milan Minić (architect), architect
Ksenija Bulatović, architect
Svetlana Kana Radević, architect
Alexis Josic (born 1921), French architect

Sculptors

Petar Ubavkić (1852–1910), recognized as the first sculptor of modern Serbia
Drinka Radovanović (born 1943), author of many monuments to national heroes
Đorđe Jovanović (1861–1953), won prizes at the World Exhibitions in Paris 1889 and 1900 for the works "Gusle" and "Kosovo Monument"
Jovan Soldatović (1920–2005), author of Monument of the 1942 raid victims near Žabalj
Olga Jevrić (born 1922), awarded sculptor
Matija Vuković (1925–1985), awarded sculptor
Mirjana Isaković (born 1936), former professor at Faculty of Applied Arts
Bojan Mikulić (born 1980), recipient of the Medal of Merit to the People
Vukosava Velimirović
Miodrag Živković

Painters, cartoonists, illustrators

Michael Astrapas and Eutychios (fl. 1294–1317), Greek painters from Thessaloniki. They were invited by Serbian ruler Stefan Milutin (c. 1253–1321) and commissioned to paint frescoes at the following locations: Church of Saint Clement at Ohrid (1294–1295); Church of Saint Niketas at Čucer Sandevo (before 1316); Church of Holy Virgin of Ljeviša in Prizren (1307); and Church of Saint George at Staro Nagoričane (1317)
Đorđe Mitrofanović (ca. 1550–1630), Serbian fresco painter and muralist who travelled and worked throughout the Balkans and the Levant.
Tripo Kokolja (1661–1713), Venetian painter, born in Perast, who is remembered for his still life and landscape painting.
Hristofor Žefarović (1710–1753)
Jovan Četirević Grabovan (1720–1781)
Dimitrije Bačević (1735–1770)
Teodor Kračun (1730–1781)
Jakov Orfelin, Baroque painter
Nikola Nešković (1740–1789)
Teodor Ilić Češljar (1746–1793)
Stefan Gavrilović (c. 1750–1823)
Jovan Pačić (1771–1849)
Pavel Đurković (1772–1830)
Petar Nikolajević Moler (1775–1816), revolutionary and painter
Georgije Bakalović (1786–1843), Serbian painter
Olja Ivanjicki, contemporary artist in fields such as sculpture, poetry, costume design, architecture and writing, but was best known for her painting.
Đorđe Andrejević Kun (1904–1964) Serbian and Yugoslavian painter, designer of the Belgrade Coat of Arms and reputedly designed the Coat of arms of the Socialist Federal Republic of Yugoslavia and Yugoslav orders and medals
Sreten Stojanović (1898–1960), one of the most prominent Yugoslav sculptors of the 20th century
Dimitrije Avramović (1815–1855), painter known best for his iconostasis and frescos
Dragan Aleksić (1901–1958), Yugoslav dadaist painter, founder of Yugo-Dada
Janko Brašić (1906–1994), one of the foremost contributors to the naive art genre
Marko Čelebonović (1902–1986), artist
Petar Dobrović (1890–1942), Austro-Hungarian politician and painter. President of the short-lived Serbo-Hungarian Baranya-Baja Republic.
Mladen Srbinović
Uroš Đurić
Veljko Stanojević (1878–1977)
Đura Jakšić
Mladen Josić
Paja Jovanović
Stevan Knežević
Stevan Aleksić
Milan Konjović
Uroš Knežević
Todor Švrakić (1882–1931)
Đorđe Krstić
Milan Konjović
Aleksandar Luković
Mihael Milunović
Milo Milunović
Marko Murat
Viktor Mitic
Milena Pavlović-Barili
Đorđe Petrović
Mina Karadžić
Ljuba Popović
Ljubomir Popović
Mića Popović
Uroš Predić
Miodrag B. Protić
Djordje Prudnikov
Zora Petrović (1894–1962)
Novak Radonić
Radomir Reljić
Ljubica Sokić (1914–2009)
Radomir Stević Ras (1931–1982), Serbian painter and designer
Sava Stojkov
Živko Stojsavljević (1900–1978)
Sava Šumanović
Ivan Tabaković
Milica Tomić
Vladimir Veličković
Beta Vukanović
Rista Vukanović
Risto Stijović (1894–1974)
Predrag Koraksić Corax (born 1933), political caricaturist
Aleksandar Zograf (born 1963), cartoonist
Zoran Janjetov (born 1961), comics artist
Aleksa Gajić (born 1974), comics artist
Branislav Kerac (born 1952), comics artist, created Cat Claw
Gradimir Smudja (born 1956), cartoonist in France and Italy, published acclaimed "Le Cabaret des Muses"
Jugoslav Vlahović (born 1949), illustrator, known for many Yugoslav album covers
Ljubomir Pavićević Fis, graphic- and industrial designer, According to the Belgrade Museum of Applied Arts, "Serbia's oldest and most well-known designer".
Marina Abramović (born 1946), performance artist 
Ana Prvacki (born 1976), performance and installation artist
Sasa Markovic Mikrob 
Tanja Ostojić 
Ilija Bašičević
Jovan Bijelić
Kossa Bokchan
Bratsa Bonifacho
Zuzana Chalupová
Radomir Damnjanović Damnjan
Jasmina Đokić
Uroš Đurić
Dragan Malešević Tapi
Draginja Vlasic (1928–2011), painter
Pavel Đurković
Ljubinka Jovanović
Irena Kazazić, Slovenian painter of Serbian origin
Bernat Klein, Serbian artist of Jewish antecedents
Stevan Knežević
Milan Konjović
Vladislav Lalicki
Petar Meseldžija
Milorad Bata Mihailović
Predrag Milosavljević
Mihael Milunović
Petar Omčikus
Dušan Otašević
Slobodan Peladić
Relja Penezic
Mića Popović
Miodrag B. Protić
Đorđe Prudnikov
Radomir Stević Ras
Radomir Reljić
Gradimir Smudja
Vladislav Titelbah
Vladimir Veličković
Ana Milenkovic, Belgrade painter living in London, England
Dragutin Inkiostri Medenjak, painter and is also considered the first interior designer in Serbia.

Designers

Roksanda Ilincic, Serbian-born British fashion designer
Marijana Matthäus, Serbian fashion designer
Bata Spasojević, Serbian fashion designer
Bojana Sentaler, Serbian-born Canadian fashion designer
Ana Kras, Serbian-born American fashion and furniture designer, photographer
George Styler, Serbian-born American fashion designer
Zoran Ladicorbic, Serbian-born American fashion designer
Gorjana Reidel, Serbian-born American jewelry designer
Jelena Behrend, Serbian-born American jewelry designer
Rushka Bergman, Serbian-born American fashion stylist and editor
Jovan Jelovac, founder and director of Belgrade Design Week
Sacha Lakic, Serbian-born French automotive and furniture designer
Marek Djordjevic, automobile designer
Ivana Pilja, fashion designer
Ana Ljubinković, fashion designer
Nevena Ivanović, fashion designer
Ana Rajcevic, fashion artist
Melina Džinović, fashion designer
Aleksandar Protić, fashion designer
Ana Šekularac, British fashion designer of Serbian descent
Aleksandra Lalić, fashion designer
Verica Rakocević, fashion designer
Ivana Sert, swimsuit designer, television presenter, model
Evica Milovanov-Penezic, glove designer
Boris Nikolić, fashion designer
Elena Karaman Karić, interior designer, furniture designer
Ines Janković, fashion designer
Sonja Jocić, fashion designer
Mihailo Anušić, fashion designer
Zvonko Marković, fashion designer

Photographers

Anastas Jovanović (1817–1899), first professional photographer in Serbia
Milan Jovanović (1863–1944), influential Serbian photographer, nephew of Paja Jovanović.
Branibor Debeljković) (1916–), first photographer member of ULUS (Serbian Association of Artists)
Srdjan Ilic, award-winning press photographer
Boogie (Vladimir Milivojevich), Serbian-born American documentary photographer
Zoran Đorđević, press photographer and film lecturer
Dragan Tanasijević, portrait photographer
Stevan Kragujević, photojournalist and art photographer
Goran Tomasevic, award-winning press photographer for Reuters
Željko Jovanović, press photographer
Jelena Medić, photographer, playwright and actress
Milena Rakocević, fashion photographer

Literature

Medieval 

Buća, noble family, originating in Kotor during the Middle Ages. Some of their antecedents were writers and poets.
Miroslav of Hum, 12th-century Great Prince (Велики Жупан) of Zachlumia from 1162 to 1190, an administrative division (appanage) of the medieval Serbian Principality (Rascia) covering Herzegovina and southern Dalmatia.
Anonymous author of the Chronicle of the Priest of Duklja, a 12th-century literary work, preserved in its Latin version only, has all the indication that it was written in Old Slavic, or, at least, that a portion of the material included in it existed previously in the Slavic language.
Stefan Nemanja (1113–1199), issued an edict called the "Hilandar Charter" for the newly established Serbian monastery at Mount Athos.
Stefan the First-Crowned (1165–1228), wrote "The Life of Stefan Nemanja", a biography of his father.
Saint Sava (1174–1236), Serbian royalty and Archbishop, author of oldest known Serbian constitution – the Zakonopravilo . Also, he authored Karyes Typikon in 1199 and Studenica Typikon in 1208.
Monk Simeon (c. 1170–1230), wrote Vukan's Gospel.
Atanasije (scribe) (c. 1200–1265), a disciple of Saint Sava, was a Serbian monk-scribe who wrote a "Hymn to Saint Sava" and a "Eulogy to Saint Sava".
Grigorije the Pupil, author of Miroslav Gospel and Miroslav of Hum commissioned it.
Domentijan (c. 1210–died after 1264), Serbian scholar and writer. For most of his life, he was a monk dedicated to writing biographies of clerics, including "Life of St. Sava."
Bratko Menaion, represents the oldest Serbian transcription of this liturgical book, discovered in the village of Banvani, and written by presbyter Bratko during the reign of king Stefan Vladislav I of Serbia in 1234.
Stefan Uroš I of Serbia (1223–1277), author of the Ston Charter (1253).
Dragolj Code, written in 1259 by Serbian monk Dragolj.
Theodosius the Hilandarian (1246–1328), technically the first Serbian novelist, wrote biographies of Saint Sava and St. Simeon
Nikodim I (c. 1250–1325), Abbot of Hilandar (later Serbian Archbishop), issued an edict (gramma) wherein he grants to the monks of the Kelion of St. Sava in Karyes a piece of land and an abandoned monastery. He translated numerous ancient texts and wrote some poetry. Also, he wrote Rodoslov (The Lives of Serbian Kings and Bishops).
Jakov of Serres (1300–1365), author of Triodion.
Elder Grigorije (fl. 1310–1355), Serbian nobleman and monk, possibly "Danilo's pupil" (Danilov učenik), i.e. the main author of "Žitija kraljeva i arhiepiskopa srpskih".
Isaija the Monk (14th century), translated the works of Pseudo-Dionysius the Areopagite.
Anonymous Athonite (also known in Serbia as Nepoznati Svetogorac; late 14th to mid-15th century) was Isaija the Monk's biographer and one of the many unidentified authors of Medieval works.
Elder Siluan (14th century), author of a hymn to Saint Sava. Hesychasm left a strong imprint in Serbian medieval literature and art, which is evident in works by Domentijan and Teodosije the Hilandarian, but most prominently in the writings of Danilo of Peć, Isaija the Monk and Elder Siluan.
Stefan Dušan (1308–1355), author of Dušan's Code, the second oldest preserved constitution of Serbia.
Stanislav of Lesnovo (c. 1280–1350), wrote "Oliver's Menologion" in Serbia in 1342.
Jefrem (patriarch) (c. 1312–1400), born in a priestly family, of Bulgarian origin, was the Patriarch of the Serbian Orthodox Church, from 1375 to 1379 and from 1389 to 1392. He was also a poet who left a large body of work, preserved in a 14th-century manuscript from Hilandar Monastery.
Dorotej of Hilandar, wrote a charter for the monastery of Drenča in 1382.
Cyprian, Metropolitan of Moscow (1336–1406), Bulgarian-born, Serbian clergyman who as the Metropolitan of Moscow wrote The Book of Degrees (Stepénnaya kniga), which grouped Russian monarchs in the order of their generations. The book was published in 1563.
Rajčin Sudić (1335–after 1360), Serbian monk-scribe who lived during the time of Lord Vojihna, the father of Jefimija.
Jefimija (1310–1405), daughter of Caesar Vojihna and widow of Jovan Uglješa Mrnjavčević, took monastic vows and is the author of three found works, including "Praise to Prince Lazar". One of the earliest European female writers.
Saint Danilo II, wrote biographies of Serbian medieval rulers, including the biography of Jelena, the wife of King Stefan Dragutin.
Antonije Bagaš, translated works from Greek into Serbian.
Euthymius of Tarnovo, founder of the Tarnovo Literary School that standardized the literary texts of all Orthodox Slavs, including those in Serbia and in Kievan Rus (Ukraine, Belarus, and Russia). 
Nikola Radonja (c. 1330–1399), as monk Gerasim, served and helped with great merit Hilandar and other monasteries at Mount Athos, and authored "Gerasim Chronicle" (Gerasimov letopis).
Princess Milica (1335–1405), consort of Prince Lazar. One of the earliest European female writers.
Psalter of Branko Mladenović, dated 1346.
Vrhobreznica Chronicle, also written between 1350 and 1400 by an anonymous monk-scribe.
Jefrem (patriarch), twice Serbian patriarch, though Bulgarian born. He was also a poet.
Maria Angelina Doukaina Palaiologina (1350–1394), Serbian writer.
Kalist Rasoder
Gregory Tsamblak (fl. 1409–1420), Bulgarian writer and cleric, abbot of Serbia's Visoki Dečani, wrote A Biography of and Service to St. Stephen Uroš III Dečanski of Serbia, and On the Transfer of Relics of Saint Paraskeva to Serbia.
Danilo III, Patriarch of the Serbs (c. 1350–1400), Serbian patriarch and writer. He wrote Slovo o knezu Lazaru (Narrative About Prince Lazar).
Nikola Stanjević (fl. 1355), commissioned monk Feoktist to write Tetravangelion at the Hilandar monastery, now on exhibit at the British Museum in London, collection No. 154.
Jelena Balšić (1366–1443), educated Serbian noblewoman, who wrote the Gorički zbornik, correspondence between her and Nikon of Jerusalem, a monk in Gorica monastery (Jelena's monastic foundation) on Beška (Island) in Zeta under the Balšići. She is now regarded as a representative of Montenegro because she was married on what eventually became Montenegrin territory, though Montenegro did not exist in her day.
Stefan Lazarević (1374–1427), Knez/Despot of Serbia (1389–1427), wrote biographies and poetry, one of the most important Serbian medieval writers. He founded the Resava School at Manasija monastery.
Kir Joakim, late 14th century musical writer.
Dečani Chronicle, written by an anonymous monk, also from the Resava School made famous by Manasija monastery. Rewritten and published in 1864 by Archimandrite Serafim Ristić of the Dečani Monastery
Oxford Serbian Psalter, written by an anonymous monk-scribe.
Munich Serbian Psalter, written by an anonymous monk-scribe.
Tomić Psalter, named after Simon Tomić, a Serbian art collector, found the 14th century illuminated manuscript in Old Serbia in 1901.
Đurađ Branković (1377–1456), author psalter Oktoih, published posthumously in 1494 by Hieromonk Makarije, the founder of Serbian and Romanian printing.
Romylos of Vidin, also known as Romylos of Ravanica where he died in the late 1300s.
Kir Stefan the Serb (late 14th and early 15th century), Serbian monk-scribe and composer.
Nikola the Serb (late 14th and early 15th century), Serbian monk-scribe and composer.
Isaiah the Serb, monk-scribe and composer of chants in the 15th century. He finished the translation from Greek to Serbian of the Corpus Areopagiticum, the works of Pseudo-Dionysius the Areopagite, in 1371, and transcribed the manuscripts of Joachim, Domestikos of Serbia.
Danilo III (patriarch), writer and poet.
Constantine of Kostenets (fl. 1380–1431), Bulgarian writer and chronicler who lived in Serbia, author of the biography of Despot Stefan Lazarević and of the first Serbian philological study, Skazanije o pismenah (A History on the Letters).
Kantakuzina Katarina Branković (1418/19–1492), remembered for commissioning the Varaždin Apostol in 1454.
Radoslav Gospels, work of both Celibate Priest Feodor, also known as "Inok from Dalsa" (fl. 1428–1429), who is credited for transcribing the Radoslav Gospel (Tetraevangelion) in the Serbian recension, now in the National Library of Russia in St. Petersburg. Radoslav is the famed miniaturist who illuminated the pages.
Jelena Balšić's correspondence with monk Nikon of Jerusalem between 1441 and 1442 is found in Gorički zbornik, named after the island of Gorica in Lake Skadar where Jelena built a church.
Dimitrije Kantakuzin, while residing in the Rila monastery in 1469 Kantakuzin wrote a biography of Saint John of Rila and a touching "Prayer to the Holy Virgin" imploring her aid in combating sin.
Konstantin Mihailović (c. 1430–1501), the last years of his life were spent in Poland where he wrote his Turkish Chronicle, an interesting document with a detailed description of the historical events of that period as well as various customs of the Turks and Christians.
Pachomius the Serb (Paxomij Logofet), prolific hagiographer who came from Mount Athos to work in Russia between 1429 and 1484. He wrote eleven saint's lives (zhitie) while employed by the Russian Orthodox Church in Novgorod. He was one of the representatives of the ornamental style known as pletenje slova (word-braiding).
Dimitar of Kratovo, 15th-century Serb writer and lexicographer of the Kratovo Literary School.
Ninac Vukoslavić (fl. 1450–1459), chancellor and scribe at the court of Scanderbeg, and author of his letters.
Deacon Damian who wrote "Koporin Chronicle" in 1453.
Vladislav the Grammarian (fl. 1456–1483), Serbian monk, writer, historian and theologian.
Đurađ Crnojević (fl. 1490–1496), first printed the Oktoih at Cetinje in 1495.
Božidar Vuković (ca. 1465–1540), one of the writers and early printers of Serb books.
Andrija Paltašić, early printer and publisher of Serb books.
Dimitar of Kratovo, 15th-century Serb writer and lexicographer, one of the most important members of the Kratovo literary school.
Martin Segon, Serbian writer, Catholic Bishop of Ulcinj and a 15th-century humanist.
Lazar of Hilandar After Pachomius the Serb, the most significant Serbian monk in Imperial Russia.
Hieromonk Makarije (1465–c. 1530) is the founder of Serbian and Romanian printing, having printed the first book in the Serbian language in Obod (Crnagora) in 1493, and the first book in Wallachia. He also wrote extensively.

Baroque 

Hieromonk Pahomije (c. 1480–1544) learned the skills of the printing trade from Hieromonk Makarije at the Crnojević printing house.
Paskoje Primojević (fl. 1482–1527) was a poet and Serbian scribe in the Serbian Chancellery in Dubrovnik during the time of the Republic of Ragusa.
Božidar Goraždanin founded the Goražde printing house in the 1520s.
Benedikt Kuripečič (1491–1531) was the first to record part of the folk songs of the Battle of Kosovo dealing with Miloš Obilić's exploits.
Stefan Paštrović (fl. 1560–1599), author of two books, engaged a certain hieromonk Sava of Visoki Dečani to print them in Venice at the Francesco Rampazetto and Heirs publishing house in 1597.
Hegumen Mardarije (fl. 1543–45) was a Serbian Orthodox abbott and one of the first printers.
Hieromonk Mardarije (fl. 1550–1568) used to print his books at Mrkšina crkva printing house before the Ottomans destroyed it.
Bonino De Boninis, early printer and publisher in Dubrovnik.
Trojan Gundulić is remembered for printing the first book in Belgrade in 1552, "The Four Gospels".
Vićenco Vuković was one of the major printers of 16th century Serbia, like his father before him.
Jerolim Zagurović was a Catholic-Serb printer from Kotor.
Stefan Marinović was a Serb printer from Scutari during the time of Vićenco Vuković, Jerolim Zagurović, Jakov of Kamena Reka and others. The longest-lived printing in the Balkans was done at Scutari, where Stefan Skadranin worked between 1563 and 1580. When his press stopped, because of continued Turkish authority over the region, Serbian printing left the Balkans. Later, Serbian books were printed in Venice, Leipzig, Vienna, and Trieste.
Jakov of Kamena Reka worked in the Vuković printing house in Venice with Vićenco Vuković, son of Božidar.
Radiša Dimitrović owned the Belgrade printing house where many medieval works were published.
Mojsije Dečanac (fl. 1536–40) is remembered for printing Praznićni minej (Holiday Menaion) of Božidar Vuković in Venice in 1538.
Hieromonk Genadije was another printer who worked alongside hieromonk Teodosije at Mileševa monastery and later in Venice with hierodeacon Mojsije and hieromonk Teodosije.
Dimitrije Karaman, born in Lipova, Arad in the early 1500s, was an early Serbian poet and bard.
Peja (priest) wrote a poem In the Court and in the Dungeon, from The Service of Saint George of Kratovo, and a biography of the same saint between 1515 and 1523.
Teodor Ljubavić wrote the Goražde Psalter in 1521.
Tronoša Chronicle was written in 1526 and transcribed by hieromonk Josif Tronoša in the eighteenth century.
Jovan Maleševac was a Serbian Orthodox monk and scribe who collaborated in 1561 with the Slovene Protestant reformer Primož Trubar to print religious books in Cyrillic.
Matija Popović was a 16th-century Serbian Orthodox cleric from Ottoman Bosnia who also supported the Reformation movement.
Peter Petrovics was a 16th-century Serbian magnate and one of Hungary's most influential and fervent supporters of the Reformation.
Luka Radovanović was a 15th-century Serb Catholic priest from Ragusa who owned a small printing press, one of the earliest at the time.
Luka Primojević is another early printer of the 16th century from Ragusa to use Church Slavonic, Cyrillic type.
Dimitrije Ljubavić (1519–1563) was a Serbian Orthodox deacon, humanist, writer, and printer who sought to bring a rapprochement between the Lutherans and the Eastern Orthodox Church.
Pajsije I Janjevac (1542–1649) was a Serbian Patriarch and an author whose works showed an admixture of popular elements.
Jovan the Serb of Kratovo (1526–1583) was a Serbian writer and monk whose name is preserved as the author of six books, now part of the Museum Collection of the Serbian Orthodox Church.
Teodor Račanin (Bajina Bašta, c. 1500–Bajina Bašta, past-1560) was the first Serbian writer and monk of the Rachan Scriptorium School mentioned in Ottoman and Serbian sources.
Inok Sava (c. 1530–after 1597) was the first to write and publish a Serbian Primer (syllabary) at the printing press of Giovanni Antonio Rampazetto in Venice in two editions, first on 20 May and the second on 25 May 1597, after which the book somehow fell into neglect only to be rediscovered recently. 
Georgije Mitrofanović (c.1550–1630) was a Serbian Orthodox monk and painter whose work can be seen in the church at the Morača monastery.
Vićenco Vuković was one of the major printers of 16th century Serbia, like his father before him.
Mavro Orbin (1563–1614) was the author of the "Realm of the Slavs" (1601) which made a significant impact on Serbian historiography, influencing future historians, particularly Đorđe Branković (count).
Zograf Longin was an icon painter and writer.
Jerolim Zagurović was a Catholic-Serb printer from Kotor.
Stefan Marinović was a Serb printer from Scutari during the time of Vićenco Vuković, Jerolim Zagurović, Jakov of Kamena Reka and others.
Jakov of Kamena Reka worked in the Vuković printing house in Venice with Vićenco Vuković.
Mariano Bolizza (fl. 1614) was a prominent Serbian writer who also wrote in Italian.
Gavril Stefanović Venclović (fl. Bajina Bašta, 1670–Szentendre, 1749), one of the first and most notable representatives of Serbian Baroque and Enlightenment literature, wrote in the vernacular. Milorad Pavić saw Venclović as a living link between the Byzantine literary tradition and the emerging new views on modern literature. He was the precursor of enlightenment aiming, most of all, to educate the common folk.
Zaharije Orfelin (1726–1785), one of the most notable representatives of the Serbian Baroque in art and literature

Enlightenment 

John of Tobolsk (1651–1715) was a Serbian cleric born in Nizhyn, in the Czernihow Voivodeship of the Polish–Lithuanian Commonwealth of the time, now revered as a saint.
Radul of Riđani (fl. 1650–1666) was a Serbian Orthodox priest and chieftain of Riđani, and a prolific letter writer who kept the authorities of Perast informed about Ottoman preparations for the Battle of Perast. A collection of his letters are kept in a museum.
Kiprijan Račanin (c. 1650–1730) was a Serbian writer and monk who founded a copyist school in Szentendre in Hungary, like the one he left behind at the Rača monastery in Serbia at the beginning of the Great Turkish War in 1689.
Jerotej Račanin (c. 1650–after 1727) was a Serbian writer and copyist of church manuscripts and books. After visiting Jerusalem in 1704 he wrote a book about his travel experiences from Hungary to the Holy Land and back.
Čirjak Račanin (Bajina Bašta, c. 1660–Szentendre, 1731) was a Serbian writer and monk, a member of the famed "School of Rača".
Đorđe Branković, Count of Podgorica (1645–1711) who wrote the first history of Serbia in five volumes.
Tripo Kokolja (1661–1713) was a well-known Serbian-Venetian painter. 
Sava Vladislavich (1669–1738), framed Peter the Great's proclamation of 1711, translated Mavro Orbin's Il regno de gli Slavi (1601); The Realm of the Slavs) from Italian into Russian, and composed the Treaty of Kiakhta and many others
Julije Balović (1672–1727) wrote in Italian and Serbian. He is the author of Practichae Schrivaneschae, a manual for a ship's scribe, and Perast Chronicles, a collection of epic poetry.
Ivan Krušala (1675–1735) is best known for writing a poem about the Battle of Perast in 1654, among others. He worked in a Russian embassy in China at the time when Sava Vladislavich was the ambassador.
Hristofor Žefarović was a 17th- and 18th- century Serbian poet who died in Imperial Russia spreading the Pan-Slav culture.
Simeon Končarević (c. 1690–1769), a Serbian writer and Bishop of Dalmatia who, exiled twice from his homeland, settled in Russia where he wrote his chronicles.
Parteniy Pavlovich (c. 1695–1760) was a Serbian Orthodox Church cleric who championed South Slavic revival.
Danilo I, Metropolitan of Cetinje (1697–1735) was a writer and founder of the Petrović Njegoš dynasty.
Sava Petrović (1702–1782) wrote numerous letters to the Moscow metropolitan and the Empress Elizabeth of Russia about the deploring conditions of the Serb Nation under occupation by the Turks, Republic of Venice and the Habsburg Empire.
Pavle Nenadović (1703–1768) was commissioned by Serbian Orthodox Metropolitan of Karlovci, Arsenije IV Jovanović Šakabenta to compose a heraldic book, Stemmatographia.
Vasilije III Petrović-Njegoš (1709–1766), Serbian Orthodox Metropolitan of Montenegro, wrote patriotic poetry and the first history of Montenegro, published in Moscow in 1754
Pavle Julinac (1730–1785) was a Serbian writer, historian, traveler, soldier, and diplomat
Jovan Rajić (1726–1801), writer, historian, traveler, and pedagogue, who wrote the first systematic work on the history of Croats and Serbs
Mojsije Putnik (1728–1790), Metropolitan, educator, writer, and founder of secondary schools and institutions of higher learning.
Nikola Nešković (1740–1789) was a most prolific Serbian icon, fresco and portrait painter in the Baroque style.
Teodor Ilić Češljar (1746–1793) was one of the best late Baroque Serbian painters from the region of Vojvodina.
Pavel Đurković (1772–1830) was one of the most important Serbian Baroque artists (writers, icon painters, goldsmiths, woodcarvers) along with Jakov Orfelin (1750–1803), Stefan Gavrilović, Georgije Bakalović, and others.
Jovan Četirević Grabovan (1720–1781) was a Serbian icon painter. He painted the Lepavina and Orahovica monasteries, among others.
Kiril Zhivkovich (1730–1807) was a Serbian and Bulgarian writer.
Petar I Petrović Njegoš (1748–1830) was a writer and poet besides being a spiritual and temporal ruler of the "Serb land of Montenegro" as he called it.
Sofronije Jugović-Marković (fl. 1789) was a Serbian writer and activist in Russian service. He wrote "Serbian Empire and State" in 1792 in order to raise the patriotic spirit of the Serbs in both the Habsburg and Ottoman empires.
Tomo Medin (1725–1788) was a Montenegrin Serb writer and adventurer. He and Casanova had two duels together.
Stefano Zannowich (1751–1786) was a Montenegrin Serb writer and adventurer. From his early youth, he was prone to challenges and adventures, unruly and dissipated life. He wrote in Italian and French, besides Serbian. He is known for his "Turkish Letters" that fascinated his contemporaries. His works belong to the genre of epistolary novel.
Tripo Smeća (1755–1812) was a Venetian historian and writer who wrote in Italian and in Serbian.
Hadži-Ruvim (1752–1804) was a Serbian Orthodox archimandrite who documented events and wars in his time, established a private library, wrote library bibliographies, collected books in which he drew ornaments and miniatures. He did wood carving and woodcutting.

Rationalism 

Simeon Piščević (1731–1797), was a Serbian writer and high-ranking officer in the service of both Austria and Imperial Russia.
Dositej Obradović (1739–1811), the influential protagonist of the Serbian national and cultural renaissance, founder of modern Serbian literature
Teodor Janković-Mirijevski (1740–1814), the most influential educational reformer in the Habsburg Empire and Imperial Russia
Avram Miletić (1755–after 1826) was a merchant and writer of epic folk songs.
Avram Mrazović (1756–1826) was a Serbian writer, translator, and pedagogue.
Jovan Muškatirović (1743–1809) was one of the early disciples of Dositej Obradović.
Aleksije Vezilić (1753–1792) was a Serbian lyric poet who introduced the Teutonic vision of the Enlightenment to the Serbs.
Emanuilo Janković (1758–1792) was a Serbian man of letters and of science.
Stefan von Novaković (1740–1826) was a Serbian writer, publisher, and patron of Serbian literature.
Pavle Solarić (1779–1821) was Obradović's disciple who wrote poetry and the first book on geography in the vernacular.
Gerasim Zelić (1752–1828), Serbian Orthodox Church archimandrite, traveler and writer (compatriot of Dositej). His chief work was the travel memoirs Žitije (Lives), which also served as a sociological work.
Sava Tekelija (1761–1842) was the patron of Matica Srpska, a literary and cultural society
Gligorije Trlajić (1766–1811), writer, poet, polyglot and professor of law at the universities of St. Petersburg and Kharkiv (Harkov), author of a textbook on Civil Law which according to some laid the foundations of Russian civil law doctrine
Atanasije Stojković (1773–1832) was a Serbian writer, pedagogue, physicist, mathematician and astronomer in the service of Imperial Russia. He also taught mathematics at the university of Kharkiv.
Vićentije Rakić (1750–1818) was a Serbian writer and poet. He founded the School of Theology (now part of the University of Belgrade) when in 1810 he headed a newly established theological college and in 1812 the first students graduated from it. He was a disciple of Dositej Obradović.
Jovan Pačić (1771–1848) was a Serbian poet, writer, translator, painter, and soldier. He translated Goethe
Teodor Filipović (1778–1807), writer, jurist, and educator, wrote the Decree of the Governing Council of Revolutionary Serbia. He taught at the newly founded National University of Kharkiv, with his compatriots, Gligorije Trlajić and Atanasije Stojković.
Jovan Došenović (1781–1813) was a Serbian philosopher, poet, and translator.
Jovan Avakumović (1748–1810), known as a representative of the Serbian folk poetry of the 18th century, though he only wrote a few poems which were part of handwritten poem books

Rationalism to Romanticism 

Lukijan Mušicki (1777–1837), Serbian Orthodox Abbott, poet, prose writer, and polyglot.
Georgije Magarašević (1793–1830), eminent writer, historian, dramatist, publisher, and founder and first editor of Serbski Letopis.
Joakim Vujić (1772–1847), writer, dramatist, actor, traveller and polyglot. He is known as the Father of Serbian Theatre.
Matija Nenadović (1777–1854) author of Memoirs, an eyewitness account of the First Serbian Uprising in 1804 and the Second Serbian Uprising in 1815.
Stevan Živković-Telemak (1780–1831) is the author of Obnovljene Srbije, 1780–1831 (Serbie nouvelle, 1780–1731) [1] and Serbian translator of François Fénelon's Les Aventures de Télémaque.
Dimitrije Davidović (1789–1838), Minister of Education of the Principality of Serbia, writer, journalist, publisher, historian, diplomatist, and founder of modern Serbian journalism and publishing.
Luka Milovanov Georgijević (1784–1828) is considered the first children's poet of new Serbian literature. He collaborated with Vuk Karadžić on the production of grammars and the dictionary.
Stefan Stefanović (1807–1828) is a Serbian writer who lived and worked in Novi Sad and Budapest
Tomo Milinović (1770–1846) is a Serbian writer and freedom-fighter. He authored two books, Umotvorina (published posthumously 1847) and Istorija Slavenskog Primorija (lost and never published).
Dimitrije Vladisavljević (1788–1858) is a Serbian grammarian, translator and writer.
Jovan Hadžić (1799–1869) was a Serbian writer and legislator
Jovan Stejić (1803–1853) was a Serbian physician writer, philosopher, translator, and a critic of Vuk Karadžić's language reform.
Jovan Sterija Popović (1806–1856), playwright, poet and pedagogue who taught at the University of Belgrade, then known as Grande École (Velika škola).
Nikanor Grujić (1810–1887), Rationalism to Romanticism
Jovan Đorđević (1826–1900), Serbian man of letters, writer of lyrics to the Serbian National anthem
Vasa Živković, Rationalism to Romanticism
Svetozar Miletić, writer and editor of a magazine called Slavjanka, in which Serbian students living under Habsburg occupation championed their ideas of national freedom
Ljubomir Nenadović, writer
Milica Stojadinović-Srpkinja (1828–1878), poet

Romanticism 

Petar II Petrović-Njegoš, Romanticism
Vuk Stefanović Karadžić, Romanticism
Avram Miletić was merchant and writer of epic songs who wrote the earliest collection of urban lyric poetry.
Old Rashko, Romanticism
Živana Antonijević, Romanticism
Tešan Podrugović, Romanticism
Filip Višnjić, Romanticism
Sava Mrkalj, Romanticism
Đuro Daničić, collaborated with Vuk Karadžić in reforming and standardizing the Serbian language, and translating the Bible from old Serbo-Slavonic into modern-day Serbian
Vuk Vrčević, collaborated with Vuk Karadžić collecting Serbian tales and songs in Montenegro, Bosnia and Herzegovina and Dalmatia along with Vuk Popović
Ivan Stojanović, Romanticism
Branko Radičević, Romanticism
Jovan Sundečić, Romanticism
Jovan Jovanović Zmaj, Romanticism
Đura Jakšić, Romanticism
Novak Radonić (1826–1890), Romanticism
Đorđe Marković Koder, Romanticism
Milica Stojadinović Srpkinja, Romanticism
Staka Skenderova, Romanticism, a Bosnian Serb writer, teacher and social worker.
Vaso Pelagić, Romanticism
Laza Kostić, Romanticism
Stjepan Mitrov Ljubiša, Romanticism
Pavle Stamatović
Visarion Ljubiša, Romanticism
Čedomilj Mijatović, Romanticism
Kosta Trifković, Romanticism
Ilarion Ruvarac, Romanticism
Mato Vodopić (1816–1893) was a Serb-Catholic Bishop of Dubrovnik and poet, Romanticism
Marko Miljanov, Romanticism
Pavle Stamatović, Romanticism
Nikša Gradi, Romanticism
Pero Budmani, Romanticism
Ivan Stojanović, Romanticism
Mirko Petrović-Njegoš, Romanticism

Realism 

Jakov Ignjatović, Realism
Dimitrije Ruvarac, Realism
Kosta Ruvarac, Realism
Milovan Glišić, Realism
Stojan Novaković
Jaša Tomić, Realism
Gavrilo Vitković, Realism
Ljubomir Nenadović, Realism
Milan Đ. Milićević, Realism
Laza Lazarević, Realism
Stefan Stefanović
Janko Veselinović (writer), Realism
Simo Matavulj, Realism
Pavle Stamatović
Dimitrije Matić
Dragomir Brzak
Božidar Petranović, Realism
Svetolik Ranković, Realism
Stevan Sremac, Realism
Radoje Domanović, Realism
Vojislav Ilić, Realism
Svetozar Marković, Realism
Vladimir Jovanović, Realism
Borisav Stanković, Realism
Ljubomir Nedić, Realism
Sava Bjelanović, Realism
Marko Car, Realism
Paja Jovanović, Realism
Uroš Predić, Realism
Marko Murat, Realism
Svetomir Nikolajević, Realism
Nikola Musulin, Realism
Vladan Đorđević, Realism
Nikodim Milaš, Realism
Risto Kovačić, Realism
Ivo Vojnović, Realism
Ivan Ivanić, Realism; a diplomat and an author
Antun Fabris (1864–1904), Realism
Milan Rešetar, Realism
Medo Pucić, Realism
Niko Pucić, Realism
Okica Gluščević, Realism
Milorad Pavlović-Krpa

Moderna 

Petar Kočić, Realism to Moderna
Svetozar Ćorović, Realism to Moderna
Branislav Nušić, Realism to Moderna
Mileta Jakšić. Realism to Moderna
Aleksa Šantić, Realism to Moderna
Veljko Petrović (poet), Moderna
Sima Pandurović, Moderna
Jevto Dedijer, Moderna
Milan Rakić, Moderna
Vladislav Petković Dis, Moderna
Jovan Dučić, Moderna
Isidora Sekulic
Branko Miljković
Dimitrije Mitrinović
Bogdan Popović
Stijepo Kobasica
Kosta Abrašević, Moderna
Prince Bojidar Karageorgevitch
Jela Spiridonović-Savić
Veljko Petrović
Dušan Vasiljev
Momčilo Nastasijević, poet
Vojislav Jovanović Marambo
Prince Bojidar Karageorgevitch
Jovan Popović

Avant-Garde 

Momčilo Nastasijević
Vojislav Jovanović Marambo, naturalism, kitchen sink drama
Jelena Dimitrijević
Miloš Crnjanski for a time led a movement called Sumatraism.
Stanislav Vinaver (1891–1965)
Vladimir Velmar-Janković (1895–1976)
Oskar Davičo (1909–1989), Surrealist
Desanka Maksimović (1898–1993)
Dušan Vasiljev (1900–1924)
Vladan Desnica (1905–1967)
Meša Selimović
Dušan Matić
Milena Pavlović-Barili
Vasko Popa

Contemporary 

B. Wongar Serbian-Australian writer who explores traditional Serbian and Australian Aboriginal cultures that were both impacted by similar political structures.
Nenad Prokić
Ivan V. Lalić
Miodrag Pavlović
Branko Ćopić
Charles Simic
Milo Dor
Milovan Danojlić
Vojin Jelić
Stojan Cerović (1949–2005) writer for the magazine Vreme
Slobodan Savić
Danilo Kiš
Dejan Stojanović
Matija Bećković
Dobrica Ćosić
Milorad Pavić
Borislav Pekić
Aleksandar Novaković
John Simon (critic), Serbian-American author and theatre critic living and working in New York City.
Svetlana Velmar-Janković
Biljana Srbljanović
Jasmina Tešanović
Prvoslav Vujčić
Mateja Matejić (priest)
Živojin Pavlović
Vidosav Stevanović
Sava Babić
Ljubivoje Ršumović
Milan Milišić
Špiro Kulišić
Mirko Kovač (writer)
Vladimir Voinovich
Zoran Spasojević
Vida Ognjenović
Dragomir Dujmov
Mihailo Lalić
Aleksandar Tišma
Rade Jovanović
Dragomir Brajković
Vladimir Voinovich
Miodrag Bulatović
Novica Tadić
Raša Papeš
Nenad Petrović
Evgenije Popović
Zoran Živković
Jovan Ćirilov
Svetislav Basara
Duško Trifunović
Duško Radović
Draginja Adamović
Ljubomir Simović
Vladan Matijević
Dragoslav Mihailović
Grozdana Olujić
Dobrica Erić
Filip David
Dragan Lukić
Dragomir Brajković
Mika Antić
Siniša Kovačević
David Albahari
Aleksandar Gatalica
Radoslav Pavlović
Dušan Kovačević
Vladislav Bajac
Goran Petrović
Bogdan Bogdanović, essayist.
Radovan Zogović (1907–1986), leading Serb poet and literary critic from Montenegro.
Milovan Vitezović
Jelena Dimitrijević
Mir-Jam
Radomir Belaćević
Ovidiu Pecican, Romanian writer of Serbian origin.
Vesna Goldsworthy, writer who now lives and works in England.
Radosav Stojanović (born 1950)
Olivia Sudjic, British fiction writer
Aleksandra Čvorović (born 1972), Serbian writer from Banja Luka 
Jovan Zivlak
Miroljub Todorović (1940)
Slaven Radovanović (1947)
Slobodan Škerović (1954)
Ilija Bakić (1960)
Zoran Stefanović (1969)
Branislava Ilić (1970)
Jelena Ćirić (born 1973), Serbian writer from Prague 
Biljana Jovanović
Uroš Petrović
Srđan Srdić

Performing artists

Actors

Nevenka Urbanova (1909–2007), actress
Beba Lončar, Serbian-Italian film actress
Sloboda Mićalović
Dragan Mićanović
Miki Manojlović (born 1950), Yugoslav and Serbian actor, star of some of the most important films in Yugoslav cinema, president of the Serbian Film Center since 2009
Marija Karan (born 1982)
Danica Curcic Danish actress, Serbian parentage
Dragomir Gidra Bojanić
Anica Dobra (born 1963), Serbian actress, who won Bavarian Film Awards "Best Young Actress" for Rosamunde, cast in German Love Scenes from Planet Earth
Mel Novak
Ben Mulroney
Branka Katić, Serbian actress
Branko Tomović
Danilo Stojković
Predrag Bjelac
Dragan Bjelogrlić (born 1963), Serbian actor
Miloš Biković
Dragan Nikolić
Gala Videnović
Gojko Mitić
Iván Petrovich (1894–1962) German actor of Serbian origin, silent screen star
Ivan Rassimov brother of actress Rada Rassimov (born Djerasimović)
Lazar Ristovski, actor and director
Ljuba Tadić
Ljubiša Samardžić
Nenad Jezdić
Đoko Rosić
Mija Aleksić
Milena Dravić
Radmila Savićević
Ružica Sokić
Svetlana Bojković
Rahela Ferari
Radmila Živković
Eva Ras
Renata Ulmanski
Vesna Čipčić
Gorica Popović
Ljiljana Blagojević
Jelica Sretenović
Anita Mančić
Nataša Ninković
Katarina Žutić
Zlata Petković
Branka Katić
Vera Čukić
Dubravka Mijatović
Olivera Katarina
Olga Odanović
Neda Arnerić
Miodrag Petrović Čkalja
Mira Banjac
Mira Stupica
Nataša Šolak
Nikola Đuričko
Nikola Kojo
Pavle Vujisić
Petar Božović
Predrag Miletić
Miloš Samolov
Gordan Kičić
Seka Sablić, actress
Slobodan Aligrudić
Sonja Kolačarić, Serbian actress
Stevan Šalajić (1929–2002)
Sonja Savić, Serbian actress
Srđan Žika Todorović
Stevo Žigon
Velimir Bata Živojinović
Vesna Trivalić
Vojin Ćetković
Vojislav Brajović
Zoran Bečić
Zoran Cvijanović
Zoran Radmilović
Radoš Bajić
Branimir Brstina
Žarko Laušević
Jovan Janićijević Burduš
Slavko Štimac
Milan Gutović
Nikola Simić
Branko Pleša
Vlastimir Đuza Stojiljković
Bekim Fehmiu
Rade Marković
Mihajlo Bata Paskaljević
Josif Tatić
Živojin Milenković
Marko Nikolić
Milorad Mandić
Milenko Zablaćanski
Predrag Ejdus
Branko Cvejić
Aljoša Vučković
Dejan Čukić
Bora Todorović
Mirjana Karanović
Aleksandar Berček
Branislav Lečić
Slavko Labović
Pavle Vujisić
Taško Načić, Yugoslav actor
Jelena Tinska, actress and ballerina
Vesna Trivalić, actress
Olivera Vuco, actress
Olivera Marković, actress
Petar Benčina, actor
Mihailo Markovic, stage actor of the early 20th century, renowned for his performances in Nikolai Gogol's "Inspector"
Nina Senicar, American film actress
Aleksandar Gligoric, actor
Jelisaveta Orašanin, actress
Dragana Atlija, model and actress
Dijana Dejanovic, model and Bollywood actress
Tamara Dragičević, model and actress
Bojana Ordinačev, actress
Zlata Petković, actress
Mirka Vasiljević, actress
Danica Curcic
Branko Tomović

Film/TV directors and screenwriters

Predrag Bambić (born 1958), film and television cinematographer and producer
Dušan Makavejev, film director and screenwriter.
Aleksandar Petrović, Yugoslavian film director
Dušan Kovačević, director and writer
Srdan Golubović, director
Stefan Arsenijević, director, Golden Bear winner at the Berlin International Film Festival
Želimir Žilnik, director, Golden Bear winner at the Berlin International Film Festival
Gojko Mitić, director
Goran Gajić, director
Goran Paskaljević, director
Ivan Šijak, director
Slavko Vorkapić, director and editor
Slobodan Šijan, director
Boro Drašković, director
Srđan Dragojević, director
Boris Malagurski, documentary filmmaker

Models

Aleksandra Melnichenko (born 1977), Serbian model and pop group member, wife of Andrey Melnichenko
Nataša Vojnović (born 1979), Serbian fashion model
Maja Latinović (born 1980), Serbian fashion model
Sanja Papić (born 1984), Miss Serbia and Montenegro at the Miss Universe 2002
Danijela Dimitrovska (born 1987), Serbian fashion model
Georgina Stojiljković (born 1988), Serbian fashion model
Sara Brajovic, French fashion model
Aleksandra Nikolić (born 1990), Serbian fashion model
Olya Ivanisevic, Serbian fashion model
Ana Mihajlović, Serbian fashion model
Mila Miletic, Serbian fashion model
Sofija Milošević, Serbian fashion model
Sara Mitić, model and beauty pageant winner
Vedrana Grbović, model and beauty pageant winner
Sanja Papić, Serbian fashion model and beauty pageant winner
Anđelka Tomašević (born 1993), model and beauty pageant winner

Musicians

Singers and rappers

Aca Lukas (born 1968), pop-folk musician
Aleksandra Kovač (born 1972), pop and R&B singer-songwriter, member of K2
Aleksandra Radović (born 1974), pop and R&B singer
Ana Rich (born 1983),  pop and pop-folk singer
Bebi Dol (born 1962), pop, rock and jazz singer-songwriter
Bora Đorđević (born 1953), rock musician, member of Riblja Čorba
Ceca (born 1973), pop-folk singer
Dalibor Andonov Gru (1973–2019), rapper
Dragana Mirković (born 1968), pop-folk singer
Đorđe Balašević (1953–2021), pop-rock musician
Goca Tržan (born 1974), Europop singer, member of Tap 011
Emina Jahović (born 1982), pop singer-songwriter
Jelena Karleuša (born 1978), pop singer
Kristina Kovač (born 1974), pop and R&B singer-songwriter, member of K2
Lepa Lukić (born 1940), folk singer
Lola Novaković (1935–2016), pop singer
Marija Šerifović (born 1984), pop singer, winner of the Eurovision 2007
Milan Stanković (born 1987), pop singer
Miroslav Ilić (born 1950), folk singer
Momčilo Bajagić "Bajaga" (born 1960), rock musician, member of Bajaga i Instruktori
Nada Mamula (1927–2001), traditional folk singer
Nataša Bekvalac (born 1980), pop singer
Nele Karajlić (born 1962), rock musician, member of Zabranjeno Pušenje
Sara Jo (born 1993), pop and R&B singer
Saša Matić (born 1978), pop-folk musician
Slađana Milošević (born 1955), rock musician
Stefan Đurić Rasta (born 1989), rapper
Svetlana Spajić (born 1971), world music singer-songwriter
Šaban Šaulić (1951–2019), folk singer-songwriter
Vlado Georgiev (born 1976), pop-rock musician
Vesna Zmijanac (born 1957), pop-folk singer
Zorica Brunclik (born 1955), folk singer
Zvonko Bogdan (born 1942), traditional folk singer
Željko Joksimović (born 1972), pop singer, 2nd place at Eurovision 2004, and 3rd place at Eurovision 2012

Music performers

Maja Bogdanović, cellist
Milan
Uroš Dojčinović (guitarist)
Raša Đelmaš {rock drummer}
Denise Djokic (Canadian Cellist)
Philippe Djokic (professor of violin at Dalhousie U.)
Bora Đorđević, rock singer
Duško Gojković (jazz trumpetist and composer)
Kornelije Kovač (rock keyboard player and composer)
Zoran Lesandrić (rock musician)
Boban Marković, acclaimed brass ensemble leader (Boban Marković Orchestra), won "Best Orchestra" at 40th Guča Sabor (2000). Soundtrack for Kusturica movies.
Stefan Milenković (violin player)
Milan Mladenović (singer, guitar player)
Ana Popović (blues guitarist)
Jasna Popovic (pianist)
Laza Ristovski (rock/jazz keyboard player)
Milenko Stefanović, classical and jazz clarinettist
Radomir Mihailović Točak (rock, jazz, blues guitarist)
Miroslav Tadić (classical guitarist)
Bojan Zulfikarpašić, pianist
Filip Višnjić, guslar
Petar Perunović-Perun, Montenegrin Serb, naturalized U.S., guslar
Vlastimir Pavlović Carevac (1895–1965), Serbian violinist, conductor and founder and director of the National Orchestra of Radio Belgrade
Ivy Jenkins (Ivana Vujic), Metal bass player, fashion designer
Mike Dimkich, Punk guitarist (The Cult & Bad Religion)
Jelena Mihailović, cellist 
Marina Arsenijevic, concert pianist and composer
Nemanja Radulović, violinist

Composers

Kir Joakim (14th and early 15th century)
Kir Stefan the Serb (14th and early 15th century)
Nikola the Serb (14th and early 15th century)
Isaiah the Serb (14th and early 15th century)
Pajsije (1542–1647), the Serbian Patriarch from 1614 to 1647, also composed chants for the liturgy. 
Josif Marinković, one of the most important Serbian composers of the 19th century.
Isidor Bajić
Stanislav Binički
Dejan Despić
Marko Kon
Zoran Erić
Dragutin Gostuški
Stevan Hristić
Petar Konjović (1883–1970)
Petar Krstić
Ljubica Marić
Miloje Milojević
Milan Mihajlović
Stevan Stojanović Mokranjac
Vasilije Mokranjac
Vojna Nešić
Aleksandar Kobac
Mihailo Vukdragović
Miloš Raičković
Kristina Kovač
Kornelije Stanković
Rudolph Reti
Vladimir Graić
Petar Stojanović
Marko Tajčević
Vladimir Tošić
Jasna Veličković
Josip Runjanin, Croatian and Serbian composer, ethnic Serb.
Zoran Sztevanovity
Dusan Trbojevic
Uroš Dojčinović
Zoran Simjanović
Isidora Žebeljan
Slavka Atanasijević was a Serbian composer and pianist.
Ana Sokolovic, Serbian born Canadian music composer
Aleksandra Vrebalov, Serbian born American composer and musician

Opera singers

Biserka Cvejić (born 1923), Serbian famous opera singer and university professor, mezzo-soprano
Radmila Bakočević (born 1933), spinto soprano
Oliver Njego (born 1959), baritone, student of Bakočević, who also crossed over into popular music, eventually becoming a prominent opera singer.
Nikola Mijailović (born 1973), baritone
David Bižić (born 1975), baritone
Laura Pavlović, lyric and spinto soprano opera singer, and a soloist with the Serbian National Theatre Opera in Novi Sad.
Radmila Smiljanić, classical soprano who has had an active international career in operas and concerts since 1965. She is particularly known for her portrayals of heroines from the operas of Giuseppe Verdi and Giacomo Puccini.
Milena Kitic, Serbian-born American mezzo-soprano

Dancers and choreographers

Milorad Mišković (born 1928), ballet dancer and choreographer, honorary president of UNESCO International Dance Council
Tamara Martinović, ballet dancer

Journalists and critics

Maga Magazinović, Serbia's 1st female journalist and women's rights activist
Dada Vujasinović, columnist
Miroslav Lazanski, columnist
Vasilije Stojković, sports journalist
Milorad Sokolović, sports journalist
Ljiljana Aranđelović, news paper editor
Milan Pantić, journalist
Danilo Gregorić, news paper editor
Vukša Veličković, British cultural critic of Serbian descent
Zoran Kesić, TV presenter and talk-show host
Dubravka Lakić, film critic
Ranko Munitić, film critic
Mirjana Bjelogrlić-Nikolov, television journalist
Ivan Kalauzović Ivanus (born 1986), journalist and publicist; diaspora chronicler
Jasmina Karanac, television journalist
Gordana Suša, television journalist and columnist
Jelena Adzic, Serbian-born Canadian CBC journalist and on-air personality
Saša Petricic, Canadian award-winning CBC journalist
Anka Radakovich, American magazine columnist
Dušan Petričić, illustrator and caricaturist (Toronto Star, New York Times)
Tijana Ibrahimovic, Serbian-born American fashion journalist
Brankica Stanković, Serbian investigative journalist

Scientists and scholars

Natural science

Mileva Marić, mathematician, wife of Albert Einstein
Miodrag Stojković, genetic scientist
Milutin Milanković, geophysicist, astronomer
Gordana Vunjak-Novakovic, biomedical engineer.
Pavle Vujević, geophysicist
Siniša Stanković, biologist
Svetozar Kurepa, mathematician
Dušan Kanazir, molecular biologist 
Pavle Savić, physicist and chemist, together with Irène Joliot-Curie he was nominated for Nobel Prize in Physics
Jovan Cvijić, geographer, ethnographer and geologist
Nikola Hajdin, construction engineer
Tatomir Anđelić, mathematician
Dimitrije Nešić, mathematician
Jovan Čokor,  epidemiologist
Aleksandar Despić, physicist 
 Vuk Marinković, physicist
Rajko Tomović, physicist and inventor
Slobodan Ćuk, electrical engineer, professor and inventor
Ljubomir Klerić, mining engineer and mathematician
Milomir Kovac, veterinary surgeon and professor
Milan Damnjanović, physicist
Ilija Đuričić, veterinary physician
Bogdan Duricic, biochemist
Miodrag Radulovacki, neuropharmacologist and professor
Bogdan Maglich, nuclear physicist
Jovan Rašković, psychiatrist
Draga Ljočić, Serbia's first female doctor and women's rights activist
Petar V. Kokotovic, engineering professor and theorist
Milan Raspopović, mathematician
Jovan Karamata, mathematician
Danilo Blanusa, mathematician, of Serb heritage
Zoran Knežević, astronomer
Đuro Kurepa, mathematician
Vladimir Markovic, mathematician
Dušanka Đokić, physicist
Petar Đurković, astronomer
Milan Kurepa, physicist
Marko V. Jaric, physicist
Laza Lazarević, physician
Marko Leko, chemist
Sima Lozanić, chemist
Gradimir Milovanović, mathematician
Dragoslav Mitrinović, mathematician 
Milorad B. Protić, astronomer
Ljubisav Rakic, neurobiologist
Dušan Ristanović, medical biophysicist
Stevo Todorčević, mathematician
Pavle Vujevic, geographer and meteorologist
Miomir Vukobratovic, mechanical engineer and pioneer in humanoid robots
Bogdan Gavrilović, mathematician
Milan Vukcevich, chemist and grandmaster of chess problem composition 
Jovan Žujović (1856–1938), pioneer in geological and paleontological science in Serbia
Miodrag Petković, mathematician
Srđan Ognjanović, mathematician
Vlatko Vedral, physicist, known for his research on the theory of Entanglement and Quantum Information Theory
Tihomir Novakov, physicist
Petar Đurković, astronomer
Mihajlo D. Mesarovic, scientist and Club of Rome member.
Lazar the Hilandarian (fl. 1404), Serbian Orthodox monk who built the first mechanical clock tower in Russia
Ognjeslav Kostović Stepanović (1851–1916), created "arbonite" (i.e. plywood).
Voja Antonić (born 1952), inventor, journalist, writer, magazine editor, radio show contributor, also creator of a build-it-yourself home computer Galaksija
Mihajlo Idvorski Pupin (1854–1935), physicist, professor and inventor of a new telecommunications technology
Mihailo Petrović Alas (1868–1943), author of the mathematical phenomenology and inventor of the first hydraulic computer capable to solve differential equations
Pavle Vujević (1881–1966), founder of the science of microclimatology, and one of the first in the science of potamology
Ljubinka Nikolić, geographer and geologist, future colonist chosen for the Mars One project (representing Serbia)
Gordana Lazarevich, Serbian born Canadian musicologist and university department head
Vesna Milosevic-Zdjelar, Serbian born Canadian astrophysicist and science educator
Jelena Kovacevic, Dean of Engineering at NYU's Tandon School and Carnegie Mellon University
Jasmina Vujic, nuclear engineering professor at Berkeley, 1st female nuclear engineering department chair in the US
Gojko Lalic, chemistry professor at the University of Washington
Zorica Pantic, engineer and president of Wentworth Institute of Technology 
Maja Pantic, A.I. expert and professor
Petar Gburčik, meteorologist and professor
Adolf Hempt, biologist and the founder of the Pasteur Institute

Philosophers

Milan Damnjanović (1924–1994), philosopher, full professor at the Faculty of Fine Arts of University of Belgrade
Ljubomir Tadić
Branko Pavlović (1928–1996)
Dositej Obradović (1742–1811), author, philosopher, linguist, polyglot and the first minister of education of Serbia, regarded founder of modern Serbian literature
Branislav Petronijević, important Serbian philosopher and paleontologist in the first half of the 20th century
Justin Popović
Svetozar Stojanović
Mihailo Đurić
Davor Džalto
Veselin Čajkanović
Nikola Milošević (politician)
Vojin Rakić
Ion Petrovici (Rumanian national of Serbian antecedents)
Đuro Kurepa (1907–1992), best-known logician
Jevrem Jezdić
 Thomas Nagel (born 1937)
Svetozar Marković (1846–1875), introduced the doctrine of social reform to Serbia
Mihailo Marković
Nikola Milošević
Vojin Rakić
Divna M. Vuksanović
Dimitrije Najdanović
Dimitrije Matić
Konstantin "Kosta" Cukić
Ljubomir Nedić (1858–1902), one of the most quoted philosophers in the late 19th century, a student of Wilhelm Wundt and professor at the University of Belgrade
Ksenija Atanasijević (1894–1981), the first recognized major female Serbian philosopher, and one of the first female professors of Belgrade University
Vladimir Jovanović made a name for himself with his "Politički rečnik"(Political Dictionary) as a political theorist

Historians and archeologists

Jovan Rajić
Tibor Živković
Wayne S. Vucinich
Bozidar Petranovic, wrote the history of world literature in the 1840s, explaining that national culture had neglected literary history
Stanoje Stanojević (1873–1937)
Jovan Radonić (1873–1953)
Dragutin Anastasijević (1877–1950)
Milan Kašanin
Dejan Medaković
Ilarion Ruvarac
Panta Srećković
Dimitrije Ruvarac
Miroljub Jevtić
Miloš Milojević, historian who went to the Kosovo and Metohija region in the 1870s and used three books of travel notes to write a demographic-statistical structure of the mutual relations between Serbs and Albanians before the Serbian-Turkish Wars (1876–1878).
Spiridon Gopčević
Dušan T. Bataković, historian and diplomat
Milos Mladenovic
Sima Ćirković
Prince Bojidar Karageorgevitch
Rade Mihaljčić
Milos Mladenovic
Vasilije Krestić
Radivoj Radić
Latinka Perović
Milan Đ. Milićević
Vladimir Dedijer
Milan St. Protić
Milorad Ekmečić
Momčilo Spremić
Stojan Novaković
Fanula Papazoglu
Jevrem Jezdić
Anna Novakov
Milan Vasić
Vaso Čubrilović
Čedomir Antić
Predrag Dragić
Mihailo Gavrilović
Desanka Kovačević-Kojić
Slobodan Jovanović
Jovan Ristić
Viktor Novak was a Croatian historian who lived, worked and died in Belgrade, Serbia
Vid Vuletic Vukasović
Gavrilo Vitković engineer, professor and historian in the 19th century.
Živko Andrijašević
George Ostrogorsky (1902–1976), Russian-born Serbian historian and Byzantinist
Božidar Ferjančić, historian and Byzantine scholar
Milos Mladenovic was professor emeritus at McGill in Montreal for many years, beginning in the 1950s.
Traian Stoianovich
Milorad M. Drachkovitch author of several important books on contemporary political science and history
Risto Kovačić (1845–1909), historian
Miodrag Grbic, archaeologist
Miloje Vasić, archaeologist
Mihailo Valtrović

Economists and sociologysts

Branko Milanović (born 1953), leading economist in the World Bank's research department dealing with poverty and inequality, also a senior associate at the Carnegie Endowment for International Peace in Washington, D.C.
Radovan Kovačević, Serbian-American professor at the Southern Methodist University Research Center for Advanced Manufacturing, holder of several U.S. patents.
Milan Stojadinović (1888–1961), Minister of Finance, Prime Minister of Yugoslavia 1935–1939
Radovan Jelašić (born 1968), Governor of the National Bank of Serbia 2004–2010
Miroljub Labus, political economist
Dimitrije Matić
Konstantin Cukić
Čedomilj Mijatović
Čedomir Čupić

Editors and publishers

Jovan Jovanović Zmaj, one of the co-founders of Javor (The Maple) at Novi Sad in 1862, was its editor for many years. Zmaj is best known for his poetry.
Sava Bjelanović was the publisher of Srpski List in Zadar.
Dejan Ristanović
Darko F. Ribnikar
Vladislav F. Ribnikar
Dimitrije Ruvarac, brother of Ilarion Ruvarac
Velibor Gligorić, literary critic, editor and writer

Linguists and philologists

Dejan Ajdačić
Rajna Dragićević (born 1968), Serbian linguist, lexicologist and lexicographer.
Pavle Ivić was a leading South Slavic and general dialectologist and phonologist, and one of the signatories of the 1986 Memorandum of the Serbian Academy of Sciences and Arts.
Vuk Stefanović Karadžić (1787–1864), philologist and linguist who was the major reformer of the Serbian language. He deserves, perhaps, for his collections of songs, fairy tales, and riddles to be called the father of the study of Serbian folklore. He was also the author of the first Serbian dictionary.
Branko Mikasinovich (born 1938), Slavist
Milan Rešetar (1860–1942), linguist, Ragusologist, historian and literary critic from Dubrovnik who was a member of the Serb Catholic movement in Dubrovnik.
Luko Zore
Mateja Matejić (priest), Slavist
Svetomir Nikolajevic, the first professor at the Department of World Literature in Belgrade's School of Philosophy.
Katarina Milovuk, author of linguistics textbooks, translator, professor and women's rights activist
Ljiljana Crepajac
Sava Mrkalj
Milan Budimir
Rajko Đurić
Ivan Klajn

Legal experts and lawyers

Teodor Filipović (also known as Bozidar Grujović), lawyer and professor who taught at the university of Harkov
Sava Tekelija (1761–1842), amongst the first Serbian doctor of law, president of the Matica srpska, philanthropist, noble, and merchant.
Kosta Čavoški
Sima Avramović
Gligorije Trlajić
Teodor Filipović

Business entrepreneures

Drago K. Jovanovich (co-founder of the Helicopter Engineering Research Corporation in Philadelphia with F. Kozloski)
Milan Mandarić, Serbian-American business tycoon
Miroslav Mišković President of Delta Holding
Milan Panić President and chief executive officer, MP Global Enterprises & Associates, USA
Dejan Ristanović, founder and owner of Sezam Pro and PC PRESS
Philip Zepter (born Milan Janković), owner of Zepter International
Ljubomir Vracarevic, developed Real Aikido, a new fighting technique in martial arts.
Vane Ivanović, President of Crestline Shipping Company, London, UK
Veselin Jevrosimović, CEO and founder of Serbian IT company ComTrade Group
Miodrag Kostić, CEO and founder of MK Group
Bogoljub Karić

Criminals

Vojislav Stanimirović former Journalist Boss of YACS Crime Group that his son Punch Pavle Stanimirović took over in NYC
Zvezdan Jovanović, former member of the Serbian special police, assassinated Serbian Minister Zoran Đinđić
Mijailo Mijailović, Swedish psychopath, assassin of Swedish Foreign Minister Anna Lindh
Arkan, warlord, organized cime
Kristijan Golubović, organized crime
Pink Panthers, jewel theft network
Milorad Ulemek, assassin of Serbian Prime Minister Zoran Đinđić and former Serbian President Ivan Stambolić

Sportspeople

Basketball

Aleksandar Nikolić "Aca" (1924–2000), FIBA Hall of Fame, Euroleague Top 10 coaches; WC Coach 78', EC Coach 77', EC Cup 70', 72', 73'
Radivoj Korać "Žućko" (1938–1969), FIBA Hall of Fame; top 50 in Europe, Euro MVP 61', Eponymous to FIBA Cup
Dušan Ivković "Duda" (born 1943), Euroleague Top 10 coaches; FIBA Coach 90', EC Coach 89', 91', 95'; EC Player 73'
Božidar Maljković "Boža" (born 1952), Euroleague Top 10 coaches, EL Coach 89', 90', 93', 96'
Dragan Kićanović "Kića" (born 1954), FIBA Hall of Fame; Mr. Europa 81', 82'; 76', 80'; WC 78'; EC 73',75',77'
Željko Obradović (born 1960), 50 Greatest Euroleague Contributors, 96', WC 98', EC 97, Bronze 99', EL Coach 92',94',95',00',02',07',09',11'; Player 88', WC 90'
Milan Opačić (born 1960)
Dusan Tadic (born 1988)
Aleksandar Đorđević (born 1967), Top 50 in Europe, Mr. Europa 94', 95', Euro MVP 97', 
Vlade Divac (born 1968), FIBA Hall of Fame; Top 50 in Europe, Mr. Europa 89'; Kennedy Award 00'; NBA All-Star 01'; Number retired by Sacramento Kings
Predrag Danilović (born 1970), Top 50 in Europe, Mr. Europa and Italian League MVP 1998; EC 89', 91', 95', 97'
Dejan Bodiroga (born 1973), Top 10 in 2000s Europe, Top 50 overall; WC 98', 02'; EC 95', 97' and 01'
Nenad Krstić (born 1983), All-Rookie NBA second team, EC Silver 09' (Active)
Sasha Pavlović
Miloš Babić
Radisav Ćurčić, Serbian-Israeli basketball player, 1999 Israeli Basketball Premier League MVP
Rastko Cvetković
Slavko Vraneš
Duško Vujošević
Mile Ilić
Zoran Savić
Nenad Marković
Borislav Stanković
Kosta Perović
Svetislav Pešić
Nikola Plećaš
Nebojša Popović
Branislav Prelević
Vladimir Radmanović
Zoran Radović
Trajko Rajković
Igor Rakočević
Željko Rebrača
Zoran Savić
Zoran Slavnić
Borislav Stanković
Dan Majerle
Dragan Tarlać
Mike Todorovich
Dejan Tomašević
Miloš Vujanić
Ranko Žeravica
Ratko Varda
Marko Popović (son of Petar Popović)
Petar Popović
Zarko Zecevic
John Abramovic
Miroslav Berić
Žarko Čabarkapa
Predrag Drobnjak
Milan Gurović
Dušan Kecman
Aleksandar "Aleks" Marić, Australian
Dejan Milojević
Darko Miličić Serbian basketball player, NBA champion 2004
Nikola Peković, Montenegrin, NBA
Marko Jarić (NBA) EuroBasket 2001, 1st 2002 FIBA World Championship
Nikola Dragovic
Aleksandar Petrović
Bojan Popović
Velimir Radinović
Nikola Jokić

Baseball

 Brian Bogusevic, MLB player
 Jess Dobernic, MLB player
 Walt Dropo, MLB player
 Eli Grba, American League Champion with the New York Yankees
 Mike Kekich, MLB player
 Mike Krsnich, MLB player
 Rocky Krsnich, MLB player
 Babe Martin, MLB player
 Doc Medich, MLB player
 Johnny Miljus, MLB player
 Paul Popovich, MLB player
 Dave Rajsich, MLB player
 Gary Rajsich, MLB player
 Jeff Samardzija, player for the Chicago White Sox, also wide receiver at Notre Dame.
 Nick Strincevich, MLB player
 Pete Suder, MLB player
 Steve Sundra, 1939 World Series Champion, pitched with the New York Yankees, Washington Senators, and St. Louis Browns
 Peter Vuckovich, AL Cy Young winner: 1982)
 George Vukovich, MLB player
 John Vukovich, MLB player and coach
 Emil Verban, second baseman for the St. Louis Cardinals, Philadelphia Phillies, Chicago Cubs, and Boston Braves.
 Wally Judnich, MLB player
 Mike Kreevich, MLB player, notable center fielder during the 1930s and 1940s
 Christian Yelich, MLB player
 Mickey Lolich, MLB Player
 Al Niemiec, player for the Boston Red Sox, Philadelphia Athletics, and Seattle Rainiers
 Steve Swetonic, MLB Player
 Ryan Radmanovich, MLB Player and member of Canada Olympic baseball team
 Erik Bakich, college baseball coach
 Joe Tepsic, MLB Player

Chess

Boris Kostić
Svetozar Gligorić
Borislav Ivkov
Ivan Ivanišević
Ljubomir Ljubojević
Alisa Marić
Mirjana Marić
Robert Markuš
Aleksandar Matanović
Milan Matulović
Igor Miladinović
Petar Trifunović
Dragoljub Velimirović
Dragoljub Ciric
Milunka Lazarević
Petar Popović
Predrag Nikolić
Predrag Ostojić
Dimitrije Bjelica
Dragoljub Janošević
Borislav Milić
Milan Vukčević
Milan Vukić
Branko Damljanović
Dejan Antić
Ozren Nedeljković
Predrag Nikolić
Dragan Šolak
Vasilije Tomović
Mirko Broder
Boško Abramović
Bojan Vučković
Borki Predojević

Football

Nemanja Vidić (born 1981), captain for Manchester United, has collection of honours including 3 consecutive Premier League titles (4 titles in total), the UEFA Champions League, the FIFA World Club Cup, three League Cup medals, as well as being included in three consecutive (4 in total including 2010–11 season) PFA Team of the Year sides from 2007 to 2009. In the 2008–09 season, he helped United to a record-breaking run of 14 consecutive clean sheets and was awarded the Barclays Player of the Season. He also collected both the club's Fans' and Players' Player of the Year awards. At the start of the 2010–11 season Vidić was selected as the new team captain of Manchester United. He collected his second Barclays Player of the Season in 2010–11.
Ivica Dragutinović (born 1975), retired, played for Sevilla FC, won the UEFA Cup: 2005–06, 2006–07; UEFA Super Cup: 2006; Runner-up 2007; Spanish Cup: 2006–07, 2009–10; Spanish Supercup: 2007; Runner-up 2010
Predrag Đorđević (born 1972), retired, played as a left midfielder for the Greek club Olympiacos for 13 years, becoming Olympiacos' greatest foreign goalscorer, averaging a goal every three league matches, as well as becoming a symbol of Olympiacos' "Golden Age" of 12 championship trophies in 13 years. Đorđević is acknowledged as one of the greatest foreign players to have played in Greece. Đorđević also played for the Serbian football team, amassing 37 caps and 1 goal.
Branislav Ivanović (born 1984), plays for FC Zenit Saint Petersburg, selected as the right-back of the season for the Premier League 2009–10 season as Chelsea won the league title and the 2010 FA Cup Final.
Saša Ilić
George Kakasic
Vladimir Jugović
Aleksandar Kolarov (born 1985), perhaps one of the best players to come from Serbia, now playing Manchester City
Darko Kovačević
Miloš Krasić
Bojan Krkić
Mladen Krstajić
Miroslav Đukić
Zdravko Kuzmanović
Aleksandar Luković
Damir Kahriman
Ljubomir Fejsa
Filip Mladenović
Uroš Spajić
Predrag Mijatović
Dejan Stanković, midfielder playing for Inter Milan since 2004; ESM Team of the Year 2006–07, 2009–10 UEFA Champions League.
Dragan Stojković
Sergej Milinković-Savić
Nikola Žigić
Marko Nikolić (born 1989), midfielder
Marko Nikolić (born 1979), coach
Momčilo Gavrić was a professional soccer player with OFK Beograd, Oakland Clippers, San Francisco 49ers, Dallas Tornado, and San Jose Earthquakes, from 1959 to 1978.
Miodrag Belodedici
Jovan Aćimović
Radomir Antić
Milorad Arsenijević
Dušan Bajević
Vladimir Beara
Vujadin Boškov
Ljubiša Broćić
Vladimir Durković
Dragan Džajić
Milan Galić
Milutin Ivković
Bořivoje Kostić
Vladimir Kovačević
Miloš Milutinović
Miljan Miljanić
Zoran Mirković
Rajko Mitić
Tihomir Ognjanov
Ilija Pantelić
Blagoje Paunović
Miroslav Pavlović
Ilija Petković
Vladimir Petrović
Preki, birth name Predrag Radosavljević, Serbian-born American international; the only player to be named Major League Soccer MVP twice.
Branko Stanković
Dragoslav Šekularac
Milutin Šoškić
Aleksandar Tirnanić
Velibor Vasović
Todor Veselinović
Đorđe Vujadinović
Saša Ćirić
Milovan Ćirić

Tennis
 
Novak Đoković (born 1987), world No. 1; 21 Grand Slams, 37 Masters 1000, 1st on Money list
Janko Tipsarević (born 1984)
Viktor Troicki (born 1986), former world No. 12 (6 June 2011)
Nenad Zimonjić (born 1976), doubles-former world No. 1 (17 November 2008), three Grand Slams
Jelena Janković (born 1985), former world No. 1 (11 August 2008), one Grand Slam, twelve WTA
Ana Ivanovic (born 1987), former world No. 1 (9 June 2008), one Grand Slam, eleven WTA
Bojana Jovanovski (born 1991),
Kristina Mladenović (born 1993), French of Serbian parentage
Alex Bogdanović (born 1984), British of Serbian parentage
Ana Jovanović (born 1984)
Irena Pavlović(born 1988)
Aleksandra Krunić (born 1993)
Nikola Ćirić (born 1983)
Ilija Bozoljac
Nebojsa Djordjevic
Marko Djokovic
Filip Krajinović
Dušan Lajović
Srdjan Muskatirovic
Sima Nikolic
Ika Panajotovic
Dejan Petrovic
David Savić
Nikola Ćaćić
Dušan Vemic
Miljan Zekić
Tamara Čurović
Tatjana Ječmenica
Karolina Jovanović
Vojislava Lukić
Teodora Mirčić
Dragana Zarić
Nataša Zorić
Ana Timotić
Slobodan Živojinović (born 1963), former doubles world No. 1 (8 September 1986), and singles No. 19 (26 October 1987)
Momčilo Tapavica (1872–1949), ethnic Serb who represented Austria-Hungary in tennis, weightlifting and wrestling in the first 1896 Summer Olympics in Athens, Greece, and won a bronze medal in the men's singles tennis competition. He is the first Serb to win an Olympic medal. He became an architect. The Matica srpska-building in Novi Sad is his work, among many others.
Jelena Genčić, coach of Monica Seles and Novak Đoković
Nikola Špear

Boxers

Nikola Sjekloća (born 1978), Intercontinental 75 kg WBC.
Zdravko Mićević (born 1982), Serbian-born Australian light-heavyweight champion.
Nenad Borovčanin (born 1978), current European Cruiserweight boxing champion, undefeated with 30 wins and no losses.
Aleksandar Pejanović (1974–2011), Super Heavyweight, Bronze 2001 Mediterranean Games. Murdered.
Slobodan Kačar (born 1957), Light Heavyweight, Olympic Gold Moscow 1980.
Tadija Kačar (born 1956), Light Heavyweight, Olympic Silver Montréal 1976.
Sreten Mirković (1955–2016), European Amateur Boxing Championship 1979 Silver.
Marijan Beneš (born 1951), Light Heavyweight, European Amateur Boxing Championship 1973 Gold, European Boxing Union 1979.

Ice hockey

For Serbian American ice hockey players, see this list.
For Serbian Canadian ice hockey players, see this list.
Dragan Umicevic, Swedish
Alex Andjelic, Serbian, coach
Ivan Prokić, Serbian
Milan Lučić, Canadian

Other sports

 Albert Bogen (Albert Bógathy; 1882–1961), Serbian-born Austrian Olympic silver medalist saber fencer
Jovana Brakočević, volleyball player
Milorad Čavić, Olympic medalist in swimming
Filip Filipović, water polo player
Nenad Gajic, lacrosse player
Andrija Gerić, Olympic champion in volleyball
Nikola Grbić, volleyball player and coach, Olympic champion in volleyball
Vladimir Grbić, Olympic champion in volleyball, member of Volleyball Hall of Fame)
Nađa Higl, swimmer
Danilo Ikodinović, water polo player
Mile Isaković, Olympic champion in handball
Sara Isaković, Olympic medalist in swimming
Aleksandra Ivošev, Olympic champion in sports shooting
Nataša Dušev-Janić, Olympic champion in canoeing
Pavle Jovanovic, Serbian-American bobsledder
Nikola Karabatić, French handball player (Serbian mother)
Svetlana Dašić-Kitić, handball player, voted the best female handball player ever
Radomir Kovačević, Olympic medalist in judo
Bronko Lubich (1925–2007) was a wrestler, referee and trainer.
Ilija Lupulesku, Olympic medalist in table tennis
Goran Maksimović, Olympic champion in sports shooting
Milica Mandić, Olympic champion in taekwondo
Branislav Martinović, Olympic medalist in wrestling
Igor Milanović is considered the best water polo player of all time
Ivan Miljković, one of the most decorated volleyball players in the world
Lavinia Milosovici, Romanian gymnast of Serbian origin, multiple Olympic champion
Miloš Milošević, swimmer
Vera Nikolić, track and field athlete, double European Champion in 800m, former World record holder
Mirko Nišović, Olympic champion in canoeing
Slavko Obadov, Olympic medalist in judo
Nenad Pagonis, kickboxing champion
Zoran Pančić, Olympic medalist in rowing
Momir Petkovic, Olympic champion in wrestling
Andrija Prlainović, water polo player
Dan Radakovich, sports administrator
Paul Radmilovic, water polo player for Great Britain in the 1912 Olympics in Stockholm
Bojana Radulović, handball player
Giovanni Raicevich, Greco-Roman wrestler (European Champion, 1909)
Rhonda Rajsich, American racquetball player of Serbian origin
Mirko Sandić, water polo player, member of FINA Hall of Fame
Branislav Simic, Olympic champion in wrestling
Milorad Stanulov, Olympic medalist in rowing
Aleksandar Šapić (born 1978), Serbian politician and a retired water polo player, considered by many to be one of the greatest water polo players of all time. Beijing 2008, Athens 2004, Sydney 2000.
Jasna Šekarić, multiple Olympic medalist in sports shooting
Dragan Škrbić, handball player, IHF World Player of the Year 2000
Ivana Španović, track and field athlete
Arpad Sterbik, handball goalkeeper representing Yugoslavia and Spain (Ethnic Hungarian), IHF World Player of the Year 2005
Dragutin Topić, track and field athlete, World junior record holder in high jump with 2.37
James Trifunov, Serbian-Canadian Olympic medalist in wrestling
Vanja Udovičić, water polo player
Ljubomir Vračarević, Serbian martial artist and founder of Real Aikido
Ljubomir Vranjes, handball player
Vladimir Vujasinović, water polo player
Paola Vukojicic, field hockey player
Bill Vukovich, Serbian American automobile racing driver
Nick Zoricic, Serbian-born, professional Canadian skier who died in Switzerland while competing
Zoran Zorkic, golf coach in Texas
Ivan Sarić, wrestler and a pioneer in aviation
Velimir Stjepanović, swimmer
Andrea Arsović, sports shooter
Tijana Bošković, volleyball player, Olympic medalist
Maja Ognjenović, volleyball player, Olympic medalist

For Serbian-American American football players, see this list; for baseball players, see this list.

Other
George Fisher (1795–1873), American military and politician, fought in the Texas Revolution and First Serbian Uprising 
Nick Vujicic, preacher and motivational speaker
Vesna Vulović, flight attendant. She holds the world record, according to the Guinness Book of Records, for surviving the highest fall without a parachute: .
Šćepan Mali (fl. 1767–1773), impostor pretender of Montenegro, by falsely representing himself as the Russian Tsar Peter III.
Black Mike Winage (1870–1977), Serbian-Canadian miner, pioneer, adventurer and one of the original settlers in the Yukon during the Klondike Gold Rush who lived to be 107 years old.
Nedeljko Čabrinović, member of the Black Hand

Spies
Dušan Popov (1912–1981), code name Tricycle, MI6 double agent, inspiration for James Bond
Branko Vukelić (1904–1945), Soviet spy
Mustafa Golubić, Soviet spy

YouTubers
Bogdan Ilić (born 1996), Rapper, gamer, actor & entertainer. 
Stefan Vuksanović (born 1998), Gamer & streamer.

Fictional and mythological characters
Petar Blagojevich, accused Serbian vampire
Arnold Paole, accused Serbian vampire
Sava Savanović, accused Serbian vampire
Niko Bellic, the main character of video game Grand Theft Auto IV

See also
List of Serbs of Bosnia and Herzegovina
List of Serbs of Croatia
List of Serbs of Montenegro
List of Serbs of the Republic of Macedonia
List of Serbian Americans
List of Serbian Canadians
List of Habsburg Serbs
Flag of Serbia

References

Bibliography

 
 
 
 
 
 

Lists of people by location